Karl Skoog (November 3, 1878 – June 4, 1933) was an American sculptor. His work was part of the sculpture event in the art competition at the 1932 Summer Olympics.

References

1878 births
1933 deaths
20th-century American sculptors
20th-century American male artists
American male sculptors
Olympic competitors in art competitions
People from Värmland County
Swedish emigrants to the United States